Worm snake is the common name sometimes given to several species of snakes:

 Carphophis
 Typhlina, a taxonomic synonym, including:
 Ramphotyphlops
 Leptotyphlops
 Typhlops, a genus of blind snakes in the family Typhlopidae

Animal common name disambiguation pages